Maari 2 is a 2018 Indian Tamil-language action comedy film written and directed by Balaji Mohan. It is a sequel to his 2015 film Maari. Dhanush, besides producing the film under his company Wunderbar Films, also stars as the title character, reprising his role from the first film. The film also stars Krishna, Tovino Thomas, Sai Pallavi, Varalaxmi Sarathkumar in prominent roles. The music was composed by Yuvan Shankar Raja with cinematography by Om Prakash and editing by Prasanna GK. The film released on 21 December 2018 to mixed reviews from critics.

Plot 
Maariyappan alias Maari, is a fun-loving gangster whose sidekicks are Sanikkizhamai and Robert, alias Adithangi ('punching bag'). Maari is chased around by Araathu Aanandi, an auto rickshaw driver who is head-over-heels in love with him. However, try as she might, Maari does not give her a second glance and constantly shows his annoyance to her.

Meanwhile, Beeja, alias "Thanathos", has escaped from prison, after killing two officers. He is out for vengeance against Maari as his brother, who was a defence lawyer, promised to get Beeja released from prison. Unfortunately, his brother is killed at the hands of Maari as the former tried to molest Aanandi's elder sister. This is also the reason why Aanandi loves Maari. While coming back after a party, Maari gets attacked, Aanandi takes him to the hospital and takes care of him. Kalai's brother Vallavan is shown to be hand-in-glove with Singayya, who has formed an alliance with Beeja to overthrow Maari. 

As per Beeja's plan, Vallavan asks Sani to send Aanandi for a job, which turns out to be drug smuggling. Aanandi unknowingly goes to do the job and gets caught by Kalai. On confronting Aanandi, she tells him that Maari asked her to do it. This sparks a doubt for Kalai. Vallavan is caught by Maari carrying drugs, and when Maari confronts Kalai, a fight erupts. Maari and his sidekicks set fire to all the drugs, and Beeja kills Vallavan to make it look as though Maari killed him. Kalai becomes enraged and orders his men to kill Maari. Maari is injured in the battle, and Beeja reveals himself as the perpetrator and shoots Maari, but Maari is saved by Aanandi, who took the bullet for him, which ended up in her spinal cord, paralysing her for life.

Vijaya Chamundeshwari is the newly appointed DC, who comes out to restore order and stop all gang violence. Maari goes into hiding with Aanandi, whose legs are paralysed. Eight years pass, Beeja and Kalai have grown to become rich dons, but when Kalai has a clear chance to become the MLA candidate of the ruling party, Beeja usurps that chance by threatening Kalai and his family. Vijaya, now the Deputy-Home secretary, in an effort to find Maari, posts his picture along with Aanandi's on newspapers. Maari meets Vijaya, requesting her to remove the photos. Maari then reveals that he was living in Tenkasi with an elderly couple. 

Aanandi got pregnant, and a healthy baby boy was born. However, due to complications by the paralysis, Aanandi dies minutes after childbirth. Maari then raises the boy, called Kaali, with help from the old couple, Sani and Robert. Kaali is shown to have inherited Maari's behaviour and keeps picking fights in school. Maari then requests Vijaya to stop coming after him as he changed his ways. When Kaali sees some students teasing a teacher, he complains about them to the principal. In retribution, the boys chase and attack him, only to get thrashed by Kaali. The council's area member, who is also father of one of the boys, calls Kaali to hit him, but Maari goes and begs for forgiveness.

Meanwhile, the city police commissioner mentions to the media that there is an informer within Beeja's gang. Using his moles in the police department, Beeja tries to figure out who the mole is but fails. It is then revealed that there was not any mole and that the whole story was fabricated to identify the corrupt policemen in the department, including the commissioner. Also, Beeja has been in ties with the commissioner and was the mole himself. He had been leaking information about his men so that he may come out clear to become an MLA candidate. 

It is also revealed that despite begging for forgiveness, the counsellor insisted on his son beating up Kaali, and so Maari beats up the counsellor and his henchmen. In a final encounter, the police turn against Beeja. Maari fights Beeja and paralyses him for revenge for Aanandi and reveals to him that Maari killed his brother because Beeja could be killed by his own brother for wealth. Soon Beeja gets sentenced to a life term in prison. Maari is then shown with his sidekicks continuing his old life and also reunites with Kalai.

Cast 

 Dhanush as Maari a.k.a. Maariyappan – Aanandi's lover turned husband, Kaali's father and also a local gangster who pesters the citizens in the Chennai vicinity and extorts money from them
 Krishna as Kalai – Maari's best friend
 Tovino Thomas as Gangadhar Beeja (Thanatos) – The Main Antagonist
 Sai Pallavi as "Araathu" Aanandhi / Aanandhi Maariyappan – an auto driver turned Maari's wife, a paralyzed lady and Kaali's mother
 Varalaxmi Sarathkumar as Vijaya Chamundeswari IAS, a new city collector, posted to control the rowdies and gang war in chennai, post leap become a Deputy Home Secretary.
 Vidya Pradeep as Anbarasi – Kalai's wife
 Robo Shankar as Sanikkizhamai (Sani) – Maari's henchman also his friend
 Kalloori Vinoth as Robert (Adithangi) – Maari's henchman also his friend
 Kaali Venkat as SI Aarumugam
 Master Raghavan as Kaali Maariyappan – Maari and Aanandhi's son
 Manobala as Kaali's school principal
 Aadukalam Naren as Police Commissioner – corrupted police officer
 E. Ramdoss as Police Assistant Commissioner
 Aranthangi Nisha as "Attu" Aanandi – Aanandhi's best friend
 Vincent Asokan as Advocate, Beeja's brother
 Avinash Raghudevan as Kalai's brother
 Ajay Ghosh as Singayyar
 Stunt Silva as Singayya's hit-man
 Stalin as the Counsellor
 Sangili Murugan as House Owner
 Sethu Lakshmi as House Owner
 Rock Prabhu as Police Inspector
 Pasi Sathya as Nurse
 M. Kamaraj as Prisoner

Production

Development 
Following the release of Maari, director Balaji Mohan announced the sequel of the film in November 2015, with Dhanush again in the lead, and also hinted that the film will kickstart shooting from January 2016. In an interaction with the media, the director stated that the film will have more depth to Dhanush's character. The film's shoot was expected to take place in early 2017, and the film's script was finalised in December 2016. However, the film's first schedule was rescheduled to take place in August 2017, because of Dhanush's commitments with other projects. In September 2017, Balaji Mohan said via tweet that the film will be a bilingual film in Tamil and Telugu; however, the Telugu version was dropped.

Casting 
On 24 September 2017, it was announced that Tovino Thomas joined the cast, portraying the antagonist. A few days later, Sai Pallavi was finalised as the heroine. Later actor Krishna, joined the cast on 7 October 2017. Varalaxmi Sarathkumar joined the cast in December 2017.

Anirudh Ravichander who composed for the film's first installment was expected to join its successor. However, Balaji Mohan announced in December 2017 that Yuvan Shankar Raja was the composer of Maari 2. Om Prakash and Prasanna GK are retained as the cinematographer and editor respectively, following their work in the film's predecessor before. A. Amaran was signed as the art director respectively, replacing R. K. Vijaimurugan, who earlier handled art direction for the previous film.

Filming 
The film's puja ceremony took place on 14 December 2017, but principal photography began on 22 January 2018. The first schedule of the film took place in Tenkasi. Varalaxmi began shooting for her portions in mid-February. The makers completed 40% of the film's shoot before the strike announced by Tamil Film Producers Council on 16 March 2018, and resumed shooting in April after the strike called off. The song sequence for "Rowdy Baby" was filmed on 2 August, under the supervision of dance choreographer Prabhu Deva. After the song sequence filmed, the makers wrapped principal photography on 24 August 2018.

Music 

Yuvan Shankar Raja composed the soundtrack album and background score for Maari 2, collaborating with Dhanush once again after a 10-year hiatus, since their last film Yaaradi Nee Mohini (2008). It also marks the composer's first collaboration with Balaji Mohan. The audio rights of the film are secured by the production house's subsidiary audio label Wunderbar Studios, with Divo as their digital partner. The album features three tracks written by Dhanush and Yuvan Shankar Raja himself, and was released on 5 November 2018, except one track which was released as a single.

"Rowdy Baby", sung by Dhanush and Dhee, was released as the first single on 25 October 2018. The video song which was released on YouTube in January 2019, received positive reviews for the choreography as well as its picturisation. On 16 November 2020, it became the first south Indian song to reach 1 billion views on YouTube. The other two songs "Maari Gethu" sung by Dhanush, Chinnaponnu, V. M. Mahalingam and Yuvan Shankar Raja, with lyrics penned by the latter and "Maari's Anandhi", written by Dhanush, and sung by Ilaiyaraaja and M. M. Manasi, was released as a part of the soundtrack album.

Release 
Maari 2 was released on 21 December 2018. The film was later dubbed and released in Hindi as Maari on YouTube on 15 July 2019 by Goldmines Telefilms. The Hindi dubbed version crossed more than 150 million views.

Awards and nominations
Filmfare Awards South
Filmfare Award for Best Choreographer- South - Prabhudeva & [[Jani Master] - "Rowdy baby" - Won
Filmfare Award for Best Male Playback Singer - Tamil - Dhanush - "Rowdy baby" -Nominated
Filmfare Award for Best Female Playback Singer - Tamil - Dhee - "Rowdy baby" -Nominated
Filmfare Award for Best Actress - Tamil - Sai Pallavi - Nominated

References

External links 
 

2010s Tamil-language films
2018 action comedy films
2018 films
Films scored by Yuvan Shankar Raja
Indian action comedy films
Indian gangster films
Indian sequel films
Films directed by Balaji Mohan